Dichochroma is a monotypic moth genus of the family Crambidae described by William Trowbridge Merrifield Forbes in 1944. It contains only one species, Dichochroma muralis, described by the same author in the same year, which is found in Peru.

References

Glaphyriinae
Crambidae genera
Monotypic moth genera
Taxa named by William Trowbridge Merrifield Forbes